B. Wurtz is (b. 1948, Pasadena, California) is an American painter and sculptor. He lives and works in New York City.

Education
Wurtz received a BA from the University of California at Berkeley in 1970, and an MFA from the California Institute of the Arts, Valencia in 1980.

Work
Wurtz is known for his transformations of commonplace materials into sculptures. Wurtz’s sculptures are characterized by an appreciation for the ubiquitous, common-place items he uses: plastic grocery bags, disposable baking trays, coat hangers, tuna tins, buttons, shoelaces, cardboard, and construction lumber.

Wurtz's work has been described as a "bricolage of found objects." He has shown his work widely in solo and group exhibitions internationally. He works in a variety of scales from small-scale sculptures to large-scale public sculptures. In 2015, The BALTIC Centre for Contemporary Art, Gateshead, United Kingdom mounted a retrospective exhibition of the artist’s work that traveled to La Casa Encendida, Madrid through 2016.  In 2018, the Institute of Contemporary Art, Los Angeles mounted a major solo exhibition of his work, This Has No Name.  

His work has been reviewed in the New York Times, Artsy, Surface, Artforum, Frieze, among other publications.

Collections
Wurtz's work is represented in the permanent collections of the Whitney Museum of American Art, the Museum of Contemporary Art, Chicago, the Portland Art Museum, among others.

References

20th-century American artists
21st-century American artists
1948 births
Living people